Pink and black, black and pink, pink-black, black-pink, or variation, may refer to:

 "Blackpink", a South Korean K-pop girl group
 Blackpink (EP), a 2017 record by the eponymous K-Pop band 
 Blackpink House, a South Korean TV variety show hosted by the K-Pop girl band Blackpink
 Black and Pink, a U.S. prison abolishonist group concerning LGBTQ and HIV+ prisoners
 Pink and Black Records, a U.S. record label, an imprint of Fat Wreck Chords
 Dark pink, a color of pink

See also
 Black (disambiguation)
 Pink (disambiguation)